Karim Ouellet (December 8, 1984 – November 15, 2021) was a Senegalese-born Canadian pop singer-songwriter. He released three albums between 2011 and 2016; his second album Fox won a Juno Award in 2014.

Early life
Ouellet was born in Dakar, Senegal, on December 8, 1984. He was adopted by Canadian diplomats at the age of one. He lived in France, Rwanda and Tunisia, before his family returned to live in Quebec City when he was 15. Ouellet learned to play the piano, percussion, and guitar as a child, and recounted composing his first song when he was seven. He took up the electric guitar as a teenager, and began playing with local bands. He met Claude Bégin in around 2005; Bégin co-wrote the lyrics and music for Ouellet's first three albums.

Career
Ouellet released his debut album, Plume, in 2011, and was the second-place finisher in that year's Francouvertes competition. He toured extensively, including appearances at the Francofolies de La Rochelle, Osheaga, and SXSW festivals.

He followed up with Fox in November 2012.  He received three nominations at the Félix Awards in 2013, including Best Male Singer, Best Single for "L'Amour" and Pop Album of the Year.  He was also designated as best new artist by Radio-Canada that year.  Fox won the Francophone Album of the Year at the Juno Awards of 2014.

His third album, Trente, was released in March 2016. He followed up later the same year with Aikido, a downloadable free mini-album.

Ouellet's music follows a folk-pop style with some reggae and African music influences. He was also a frequent collaborator with several hip hop groups, including CEA and Movèzerbe.

Personal life
Ouellet's sister, Sarahmée, is also a musician.  He served as the French-language spokesman for Black History Month in Canada in 2018.

One month after what would have been his 37th birthday, Ouellet was found dead on the evening of January 17, 2022, at L'Unisson studio in Quebec City's Saint-Roch neighbourhood. While foul play was ruled out by local police, his death prompted an investigation by the municipal coroner’s office. He was reportedly working on his fourth album at the time. The coroner's report indicated that Ouellet had died two full months before his body was found, on November 15, 2021, and ruled that his cause of death was diabetic ketoacidosis.

Discography
Leçons d'amour étrange EP (2009)
Plume (2011)
Fox (2012)
Trente (2016)
Aikido EP (2016)

References

External links

 
 Entry at thecanadianencyclopedia.ca

1984 births
2021 deaths
21st-century Black Canadian male singers
Canadian pop singers
Canadian singer-songwriters
Canadian pop guitarists
Canadian male guitarists
Musicians from Quebec City
French-language singers of Canada
Juno Award for Francophone Album of the Year winners
People from Dakar
Senegalese emigrants to Canada
Canadian male singer-songwriters
Deaths from diabetes